Pridvorica is a small village located in the municipality of Gacko in Republika Srpska, Bosnia and Herzegovina.

Demographics 
According to the 2013 census, its population was 13, all Serbs.

Notable residents
 Blagoje Adžić

References

Populated places in Gacko